The Mount Read Volcanics is a Cambrian volcanic belt that exists in Western Tasmania.

It is a complex belt due to folding, faulting and a range of tectonic events.

It is a productive mineralised belt that has profitable copper-silver and gold production of Mount Lyell, Rosebery, and Henty Gold Mine ; and numerous smaller sites of prospective mineralisation along the West Coast Range.

See also

Geology of Tasmania

References
 
 
 
 Large, R.R. (editor) and convenor: P.L.F. Collins (1986) The Mount Read volcanics and associated ore deposits : a symposium, Burnie, November 1986. Hobart : Geological Society of Australia, Tasmanian Division. 
 
 
 
 

Geologic formations of Australia
Western Tasmania
Geology of Tasmania
Volcanoes of Tasmania
Cambrian volcanism
Cambrian Australia
Volcanic belts